The 2020 Hamilton Tiger-Cats season was scheduled to be the 63rd season for the team in the Canadian Football League and their 71st overall. This would have been the second season for the Tiger-Cats under co-general managers Drew Allemang and Shawn Burke and the second season under head coach Orlondo Steinauer.

Training camps, pre-season games, and regular season games were initially postponed due to the COVID-19 pandemic in Ontario. The CFL announced on April 7, 2020 that the start of the 2020 season would not occur before July 2020. On May 20, 2020, it was announced that the league would likely not begin regular season play prior to September 2020. On August 17, 2020 however, the season was officially cancelled due to COVID-19.

Offseason

CFL National  Draft 
The 2020 CFL National Draft took place on April 30, 2020. The Tiger-Cats had nine selections in the eight-round draft after acquiring another first-round pick from the Montreal Alouettes as part of the Johnny Manziel trade. By finishing as the Grey Cup runner up, the Tiger-Cats had the second-to-last selection in each round of the draft.

CFL Global Draft
The 2020 CFL Global Draft was scheduled to take place on April 16, 2020. However, due to the COVID-19 pandemic, this draft and its accompanying combine were postponed to occur just before the start of training camp, which was ultimately cancelled. The Tiger-Cats were scheduled to select eighth in each round with the number of rounds never announced.

Planned schedule

Preseason

Regular season

Team

Roster

Coaching staff

References

Hamilton Tiger-Cats seasons
2020 in Ontario
2020 Canadian Football League season by team